Goldcreek is an unincorporated community and census-designated place (CDP) in Powell County, Montana, United States.

The community was first listed as a CDP prior to the 2020 census.

Demographics

References 

Census-designated places in Powell County, Montana
Census-designated places in Montana